The colonial colleges are nine institutions of higher education chartered in the Thirteen Colonies before the United States of America became a sovereign nation after the American Revolution. These nine have long been considered together, notably since the survey of their origins in the 1907 The Cambridge History of English and American Literature. 

Seven of the nine colonial colleges became seven of the eight Ivy League universities: Harvard, Yale, Princeton, Columbia, University of Pennsylvania, Brown, and Dartmouth. (The remaining Ivy League institution, Cornell University, was founded in 1865).  These are all private universities. 

The two colonial colleges not in the Ivy League are now both public universities — The College of William & Mary in Virginia and Rutgers University in New Jersey. William & Mary was a royal institution from 1693 until the American Revolution. Between the Revolution and the American Civil War, it was a private institution, but it suffered significant damage during the Civil War and began to receive public support in the 1880s. William & Mary officially became a public college in 1906. 

Rutgers was founded in 1766 as Queen's College, named for Queen Charlotte, and was for much of its history privately affiliated with the Dutch Reformed Church. It changed its name to Rutgers University in 1825 and was designated as the State University of New Jersey after World War II.

The nine colonial colleges
Seven of the nine colonial colleges began their histories as institutions of higher learning, while two were developed by existing preparatory schools. Dartmouth College began operating in 1768 as the collegiate department of Moor's Charity School, a secondary school started in 1754 by Dartmouth founder Eleazar Wheelock. Dartmouth considers its founding date to be 1769, when it was granted a collegiate charter. The University of Pennsylvania began operating in 1751 as a secondary school, the Academy of Philadelphia, and added an institution of higher education in 1755 with the granting of a charter to the College of Philadelphia.

Other colonial-era foundations
Several other colleges and universities can be traced to colonial-era "academies" or "schools", but are not considered colonial colleges because they were not formally chartered as colleges with degree-granting powers until after the formation of the United States in 1776. Listed below are the founding dates of the schools which served as predecessor entities and the years in which they were chartered to operate an institution of higher learning.

See also

 First university in the United States

Notes

References

 
Colonial Colleges
Colonial Colleges